Verino airfield was a Soviet Air Force based in Khabarovsk Krai, Russia located  northeast of Pereyaslavka, Russia and about 35 miles (55 km) south of Khabarovsk. Verino was an 11th Air Army airfield, with the 300 and 302nd Bomber Aviation Regiment a mainstay in later years.

History
The airfield was first spotted by Western forces during Lockheed U-2 overflights in March 1958.  Analysts found a 7,600 x 150' runway but could not see much detail. Later missions revealed as many as 93 aircraft parked on the ramps, most of them MiG-17 Fresco.  Around 1970, the airfield had been upgraded with Sukhoi Su-15 Flagon, though MiG-17 Fresco were still based here.

By the 1980s, the airfield's interceptor role had diminished and many of the aircraft were replaced with tactical and attack aircraft. These included the Sukhoi Su-24 Fencer and Mikoyan MiG-27 Flogger.

References

Soviet Air Force bases